Ministry of Sharia and the Foundations was a former government ministry in the  Ottoman Empire and the early history of the Republic of Turkey. The ministry was the highest religious authority and was responsible for the waqfs (inalienable charitable endowments under Islamic law).

History 
The ministry was established during the Ottoman era. During the early days of the Turkish Republic, it was also a ministry of Turkey. In all five governments before the Republic and the 1st government of Turkey after the proclamation of the Republic there was always a seat of the Ministry of Sharia and the Foundations in the government.

However, on 3 March 1924, by the law no. 429, it was abolished. Instead, two general directorates were established under the Prime Minister of Turkey: the "Directorate of Religious Affairs" and the "General Directorate of the Foundations" to take on the responsibilities of the former ministry. 

Up to the enactment of this law, the responsibility of education system, which was partially managed by this ministry and partially by the Ministry of National Education was totally put under the responsibility of the Ministry of National Education. This disestablishment marked the end of the 1st government of Turkey. On 6 March 1924, Prime Minister İsmet Pasha formed the 2nd government of Turkey, this time without the Ministry of Sharia and the Foundations.

Ministers

References

1924 disestablishments in Turkey
Sharia and the Foundations
Government of the Ottoman Empire
Sharia and the Foundations
Sharia and the Foundations